The family of Walker railmotors were a type of diesel railcar operated by the Victorian Railways in Australia.

After World War II, the Victorian Railways undertook a major rebuilding program known as Operation Phoenix. One of the first tasks was the upgrading of passenger services on country branch lines, through the replacement of 23 wooden-bodied railmotors built in the 1920s, and the withdrawal of steam locomotive hauled mixed trains.

An initial order of twelve  railcars, six  railcars with trailers, and twelve  railcars was placed with Walker Brothers, Wigan, England. It was then extended to include a further ten  railmotors and trailers. The first was delivered in 1948, with  additions to the fleet running through to 1955.

Construction
The power units and controls were built by Walker Bros. and shipped out from Wigan England, the underframes were built by Thompsons of Castlemaine and the car bodies were built by Martin & King, in the Melbourne suburb of Armadale. Assembly took place at the Newport Workshops. The van bodies were constructed with composite wood and steel framework, and aluminium sheeting screwed to the frames. 

The engine and trailing units were initially fitted with small plates below skirt level identifying each section as part of that specific railmotor set, i.e. 80RM, but these were removed as units were rotated through workshops and mixed with each other. Within a few years the identity of the 102 hp and 153 hp motors was marked only on the cabside door (with nothing on the saloon unit), and on the 280 hp railmotors only on one side of each motor unit with nothing on either saloon unit. Vehicle identities were occasionally further confused when cabside doors were swapped in later years.

The intended life of the Walker railmotors was only 10 years.  However, most remained in service for up to 30 years.

102hp & 153hp
The final fleet included 13x 102 hp engine/driving units 1-13RM and 16x 153 hp engine/driving units 20-35RM which looked similar; these shared 27x trailing units each mounted on only one bogie, and attached semi-permanently to the associated motor unit, leaving one motor unit of each type spare. The trailing units were not identified normally when in service, but some correspondence notes individual identities No.100 to No.111 (or No.101 to No.112) and No.220 to No.234. This was marked on a small plate on the passenger/driver door of cabs.

The passenger units were all identical with room for 18 1st class and 22 2nd class seated passengers plus 2 tons luggage, except for 100, 104 and 220, which had 18+27 seats and room for only 1.27 tons of luggage; their tare weight was a ton less than the rest of the fleet.

Newsrail April 1982 records the small-van units as "11, 12 and 20", and coupled to 3RM as of 8 June 1976, and 31RM as of 1 January 1977.

280hp
Separate to the paired units, railmotors 80-92RM consisted of two driving/sitting units, one either side of the power unit that gave its identity to the full consist. Originally, 80-91RM were in service and 92RM was spare without attached driving/passenger units.

One unit in each pair was fitted with seating for 38 1st class passengers, and the other had 56 2nd class passengers, for a total of 94 seats. Each was also capable of holding a single ton of luggage, the train crew only were permitted to walk through the centre motor unit engine room.

Unlike the 120 hp and 153 hp variants, the driving/passenger units of the 280 hp series were classed A880-A891 for the 1st class units, and B880-B891 for the 2nd class units. While possible, there's no reason to assume that the sets were broken up or shuffled around, besides the central motor section.

Trailers
To go with the Walker railmotors, sixteen trailer cars were built. The first were delivered as class RMT, numbers 50 and 51; they were reclassed to MT in 1949, and further deliveries brought the class up to 64MT.

Each was mounted on two bogies with no driving stands, so they required a runaround at terminal stations. Stylistically, they matched the 102 hp and 153 hp railcars, and were a little shorter than the 280 hp type.

Each trailer had capacity for 16 1st, 22 2nd seated passengers and 2 tons of luggage, except 55MT fitted with 38 2nd-class seats instead of a mixture.

Like the motors, these trailers were not fitted with standard couplings so special arrangements had to be made when it was necessary to move one of the trailers with a normal locomotive.

In Service
The first run was on 15 March 1948, between Heathcote and Wallan on the North Eastern line; this was with 102 hp, 1RM. The first 153 hp unit ran from Spencer Street to Daylesford, until that roster was taken by the first of the 280 hp units - 80RM - on 6 June 1950.

The railcars soon saw use on the Bendigo-Deniliquin and Ararat-Portland services, and by the time the 91RM was delivered, Mansfield, Wonthaggi, Woomelang and Wangaratta were also being served by the units. The long Glenrowan – Wangaratta section often saw the railcars exceed the  speed limit.

Each passenger unit was equipped with adjustable seating, internal heating, non-draught windows, water tanks for drinking or washing, along with ample luggage storage in overhead wire racks. At least when new, the engines did not cause any vibration in the passenger compartments. The lighting system was powered by the then-standard Victorian Railways' 24vDC supply, which utilised a belt-driven axle generator to charge batteries and  20-watt globes. Trailer cars were not fitted with their own power supply, instead drawing power via jumper cables from adjacent units; the exceptions being 54 and 56MT, which are thought to have had their own belt-driven axle generator to charge their own batteries.

The 280 hp railcars were fitted with fluorescent lighting, likely a first for the Victorian Railways.

The light construction of the vehicles proved problematic, with many needing full rebuilds by 1954.

It has been reported that the 280 hp units had provision for multiple unit control, but that this feature was never utilised. As a result, when running in multiple each unit needed to have its own driver, the two communicating through the standard whistle codes used on locomotives.

In later years the railcars' already poor riding qualities had deteriorated, especially due to their light construction. By the late 1970s the Walkers had reached the end of their lives, with a number of railcars being withdrawn from service during 1978 and 1979. By 1980 only 82RM, 85RM and 91RM remained in service. The last 280 hp Walker railmotor ran on 17 September 1980, with 82RM operating the 08:00 service from Melbourne to Woodend and return.

In 1981 the Central Highlands Tourist Railway (now the Daylesford Spa Country Railway) acquired 91RM, 32RM and 56MT with the transfer being carried out in March 1982. Restoration of 91RM began in January 1987, and was certified for traffic in March 1990.

Liveries
Each unit was originally painted in all-over royal blue, with silver roofs, striping and highlighting. After the first of the B class diesels was delivered, the Walkers then in service were repainted, with gold replacing the silver. Over time, the roofs were repainted blue to hide grime, and the logos and striping were made simpler. To improve visibility at level crossings, the cars had thin orange stripes added in the 1950s, followed by a wide orange "dayglo" band over the top of the yellow stripe below window level. Dayglo was designed to look fairly normal in daylight, but to become reflective at night. These stripes were removed from 1968.

A number of internal themes were used, with some cars having ivory ceilings and green and brown walls; others had blue ceilings with brown walls. All cars were fitted with seats upholstered in brown leather.

Typical rosters
By 1963, the Walkers had settled into a pattern with a number of routes.

The 102 hp Walkers typically ran between:
Morwell - Mirboo North
Ararat - Hamilton
Swan Hill - Piangil
Castlemaine - Maryborough
Benalla - Yarrawonga
Ballarat - Ararat
Nyora - Wonthaggi
Horsham - Goroke
Kerang - Koondrook
Ouyen - Pinnaroo and
Numurkah - Cobram

The 153 hp Walkers typically ran between:
Traralgon - Maffra
Ballarat - Linton
Echuca - Balranald
Ararat - Hamilton
Frankston - Mornington
Ballarat - Ballan
Bendigo - Deniliquin
Echuca - Kyabram "School Train", with three trailers.
Lilydale - Healesville
Melbourne - Seymour
Dimboola - Serviceton
Bendigo - Cohuna
Wallan - Heathcote
Lilydale - Warburton and
Melbourne - Mansfield

The 280 hp Walkers typically ran between:
Ararat - Portland
Melbourne - Werribee
Melbourne - Leongatha
Melbourne - Daylesford
Melbourne - Woomelang
Melbourne - Wonthaggi and
Geelong - Ballarat
Frankston - Stony Point

Some of these rosters required multiple units.

Withdrawal and Scrapping
35RM with unit no.224 was the first to be scrapped, on Thursday 15 October 1970. Scrapping then continued at a fairly easy pace until 1977, when VicRail decreed that branch lines in general were to be closed, rendering the units without a purpose. As such, 102 hp overhauls were stopped, with failed units being held awaiting scrapping instead. The same procedure applied to 153 hp and 280 hp units from April the next year.

4RM was the last 102 hp unit in service, withdrawn in December 1978; it survived longer because its engine unit had been replaced with a General Motors unit at some stage in its life, permitting a 50 mph maximum speed and allowing it to closer match the timetables applicable to the higher-horsepower units.

Withdrawals of the larger units accelerated, and by the end of 1979 only 22, 32, 82, 85 and 91RM were still in service. The latter two of that list were withdrawn next; 85RM suffered a bearing failure, and continued on to  Ballarat North Workshops on one engine; however its body condition was deemed too poor to be worth repairing, so it was transfered to Newport Workshops and was stored there. 82RM was the last of the 280 hp units to go, after running an 8:00 Melbourne to Woodend and return trip on 17 September 1980.

32RM ran with 56MT through to November 1980, when the engine was withdrawn on account of a much needed overhaul (which was never completed by VicRail). 22RM and 64MT stayed in service, usually running the 9:11am Melbourne to Leongatha and return trip on weekdays, occasionally forming a Sunbury trip or two after arriving back in Melbourne. On Saturdays the unit pair would run on the Werribee shuttles, and occasionally to either Bacchus Marsh or Seymour as railmotor shortages dictated. but eventually, the gearbox failed and the unit was withdrawn following its return from Leongatha on 1 April 1981.

Preservation

In 1981, two railmotors and a trailer – 32RM, 91RM and 56MT – were scheduled to be transferred to the SteamRanger Heritage Railway at Victor Harbor, South Australia. 91RM failed on the Ingliston Bank and the three ended up stored at Ballarat East. Later, the three units were purchased by the Central Highlands Tourist Railway, now the Daylesford Spa Country Railway. 7RM was being held at Newport for future use on the Victorian Goldfields Railway. 22RM was static in the Newport Railway Museum, with 85RM held for future addition, and 59MT was similarly allocated, but was badly vandalised, potentially to be replaced by 64MT. 82RM was stored at Wodonga for a proposed tourist service at Tallangatta.

It is thought that the passenger units which had been with 29RM and 31RM at time of scrapping had been sold for use as sheds somewhere in the Victorian countryside.

Units existing as at March 11, 2023 are:
 7RM Stored at Daylesford.
 22RM with No.225 – Owned by VicTrack, allocated to Newport Railway Museum, sub-allocated to Yarra Valley Tourist Railway. In service.
 24RM Possibly with No.228. Stored in poor condition at Huon.
 32RM In service at Daylesford.
 82RM with No.887A and No.891B – Stored at Daylesford.
 85RM with Units X, Y – Stored at Daylesford.
 91RM with No.880A and No.887B – In service at Daylesford.
 56MT – Stored at Daylesford.
 58MT – Under restoration at the Yarra Valley Tourist Railway.
 64MT – Location unknown.

Details of vehicles

102hp, 153hp and passenger units

280hp and passenger units

Trailers

Model railways

HO scale
Weico has produced whitemetal kits for the 102 hp and 153 hp Walker Railmotors and trailers.

In 2011, Precision Scale Models released a range of Walker 102 hp and 153 hp railmotors in brass, styled for eras 1950-1955 in blue and silver, 1955-1965 in blue and gold with gold roof, and  1965-1980 in blue and gold with blue roof. The models were priced at around $1,095 each, and fitted with fully lit, populated interiors and DCC. Trailers were available in packs with 153 hp railmotors, for a total of $1,695. It is known that the series included 102 hp Motor 4RM in blue/gold with gold roof.

Trainbuilder announced a series of brass 102 hp and 153 hp Walker railmotors, to retail at $1175 per Railmotor, or $1695 each for Railmotor plus trailer. Numbers include 1RM or 21RM+50MT with silver roof; 4RM, 7RM, 22RM+52MT, 25RM, 29RM, 31RM, 32RM+56MT with yellow roof, and 6RM, 10RM, 11RM, 23RM+61MT, 27RM, 30RM, 30RM+62MT, 32RM, 33RM, 34RM with blue roof. The range does not include motors 20, 24, 26, 28, 35RM or trailers 51, 53-55, 57-60, 63 or 64MT.

Auscision Models released plastic ready-to-run models of the 280 hp Walker in August 2013., retailing for $395.00 each. Models included 86RM in blue and silver; 84RM in blue and gold with gold roof, and 82RM, 88RM and 91RM in era-appropriate variants of blue and yellow with blue roof.

References

Newsrail December 1981 p. 284

Victorian Railways railmotors